The 2020–21 Lebanese FA Cup was the 48th edition of the national football cup competition of Lebanon. It started with the round of 16 on 28 April 2021, and ended on 12 May with the final.

Lebanese Premier League side Ahed were the defending champions, having won the 2018–19 edition; they lost to finalists Nejmeh in the quarter-finals. Ansar beat cross-city rivals Nejmeh on the penalty shoot-out in the final, after drawing 1–1 in regular time.

The edition followed a new format; starting directly from the round of 16, the 12 Lebanese Premier League and the top 4 Lebanese Second Division teams from the 2020–21 season participated.

Teams

Round of 16

Quarter-finals

Semi-finals

Final

Bracket 
The following is the bracket which the Lebanese FA Cup resembled. Numbers in parentheses next to the score represents the results of a penalty shoot-out.

Season statistics

Top scorers

Most assists

References

External links 
 RSSSF

 
Lebanese FA Cup seasons
FA Cup
Lebanese FA Cup